Ahora Noticias (abbreviated AN) was the flagship evening news programme for the Chilean television channel Mega. It was broadcast from 25 August 2013 until 22 July 2019 being replaced by Meganoticias.

External links 
  

2013 Chilean television series debuts
Chilean television news shows
Mega (Chilean TV channel) original programming
2010s Chilean television series
Flagship evening news shows
Spanish-language television shows